Highgate United Football Club is a football club based in the Shirley district of Solihull, having relocated from their original location of Highgate in Birmingham.

History
The club was established in 1948 by a group of former residents of the St Vincent's Home for Working Boys, run by Father Hudson's Society. They joined the South Birmingham League, before moving up to Division Two of the Worcestershire Combination in 1964. After finishing fourth in their first season in Division Two, the club were promoted to Division One.

In 1966–67 they reached the quarter-finals of the FA Amateur Cup; during the game against Enfield, several players collapsed after a lightning strike, and Highgate's Tony Allden died the next day. The game was abandoned and replayed at Villa Park, where a crowd of over 31,000 saw Enfield win 6–0.

The 1970s was the most successful era in Highgate United's history; in 1972–73 the club were champions of the renamed Midland Combination, also winning the League Cup and reaching the semi-finals of the FA Amateur Cup, losing 4–0 in a replay to Walton & Hersham at Selhurst Park after the first match at Highfield Road had ended 0–0. They retained the league title and the League Cup the following season, also winning the Birmingham Senior Cup with a 3–2 win over Darlaston. The club won a third consecutive Midland Combination title in 1974–75 and went on to win the League Cup in 1975–76 and 1976–77.

Highgate were Division One runners-up in 1981–82 and League Cup winners in 1984–85. They finished bottom of the (renamed) Premier Division in 1994–95, but avoided being relegated as the division was expanded from 18 to 20 clubs. The club won the Coventry Evening Telegraph Cup win 2006–07, and were Premier Division runners-up the following season, earning promotion to the Midland Alliance.

In 2014 the Midland Combination and Midland League merged to form the Midland League; despite finishing third in the Alliance the previous season, Highgate were placed in Division One of the new league, a level below their previous position. However, they went on to win Division One in the Midland League's inaugural season and were promoted to the Premier Division.

Ground
The club originally played at Billesley Common. By the 1960s they had moved to their current ground on Tythe Barn Lane, five minutes walk from Whitlocks End railway station. A covered stand, partially seated and partially standing, was built on one side of the pitch in July 1996 and was later named the Patrick & Philomena Meade Stand. Floodlights were installed the following year.

Honours
Midland League
Division One champions 2014–15
Midland Combination
Division One champions 1972–73, 1973–74, 1974–75
League Cup winners 1972–73, 1973–74, 1975–76, 1976–77, 1984–85
Birmingham Senior Cup
Winners 1973–74
Coventry Evening Telegraph Cup
Winners 2006–07
Tony Allden Memorial Cup
Winners 1973–74, 1974–75

Records
Best FA Cup performance: Fourth qualifying round, 1973–74
Best FA Amateur Cup performance: Semi-finals, 1972–73
Best FA Trophy performance: Third round, 1974–75
Best FA Vase performance: Second round, 2004–05

See also
Highgate United F.C. players
Highgate United F.C. managers

References

External links
Official website

 
Football clubs in England
Football clubs in the West Midlands (county)
Association football clubs established in 1948
1948 establishments in England
Sport in Birmingham, West Midlands
Midland Football Combination
Midland Football Alliance
Midland Football League